Tonight or Never (Swedish: I natt - eller aldrig) is a 1941 Swedish comedy film directed by Gustaf Molander and starring Åke Soderblom, Thor Modéen and Sickan Carlsson.

The film's art direction was by Arne Åkermark.

Main cast
 Åke Söderblom as Erik Andersson  
 Thor Modéen as John Sjölin  
 Sickan Carlsson as Margit Holm 
 Barbro Kollberg as Eva Hedman  
 Håkan Westergren as Bertil Hallgren  
 Tollie Zellman as Rigolescu 
 Erik 'Bullen' Berglund as Ekberg  
 Eric Abrahamsson as Hotel Concierge  
 Hugo Björne as Col. Werner  
 Erik A. Petschler as Berglind  
 Margit Andelius as Miss Viola Berg  
 Eivor Engelbrektsson as Miss Lisa

References

Bibliography 
 Larsson, Mariah & Marklund, Anders. Swedish Film: An Introduction and Reader. Nordic Academic Press, 2010.

External links 
 

1941 films
1941 comedy films
Swedish comedy films
1940s Swedish-language films
Films directed by Gustaf Molander
Swedish black-and-white films
1940s Swedish films